The 2013–14 Dayton Flyers men's basketball team represented the University of Dayton during the 2013–14 NCAA Division I men's basketball season. The Flyers, led by third year head coach Archie Miller, played their home games at the University of Dayton Arena and were members of the Atlantic 10 Conference. They finished the season 26–11, 10–6 in A-10 play to finish in a tie for fifth place. They advanced to the quarterfinals of the A-10 tournament where they lost to Saint Joseph's. They received an at-large bid to the NCAA tournament where they defeated Ohio State, Syracuse and Stanford to advance to the Elite Eight where they lost to Florida. Florida would later lose to eventual National Champion Connecticut.

Roster

Schedule

|-
!colspan=9 style="background:#C40023; color:#75B2DD;"| Exhibition

|-
!colspan=9 style="background:#C40023; color:#75B2DD;"| Regular season

|-
!colspan=9 style="background:#C40023; color:#75B2DD;"| Atlantic-10 regular season

|-
!colspan=9 style="background:#C40023; color:#75B2DD;"| Atlantic 10 Tournament

|-
!colspan=9 style="background:#C40023; color:#75B2DD;"| NCAA tournament

Rankings

References

Dayton Flyers Men's
Dayton Flyers men's basketball seasons
Dayton
Dayton
Dayton